Flight 571 may refer to:

Uruguayan Air Force Flight 571, crashed on 13 October 1972 in South America; subsequent events known as Miracle of the Andes
Sabena Flight 571, hijacked on 8 May 1972 in Europe; ended by a commando raid in Tel Aviv

See also
 Avro 571 Buffalo, a  British carrier-based torpedo bomber biplane
 No. 571 Squadron RAF, a British squadron of World War II

0571